David Joseph Kitay (born October 23, 1961) is an American film composer.

Filmography

References

External links
 Official website
 

Living people
1961 births
American film score composers
American male film score composers
Musicians from Los Angeles